El Arenal Natural Reserve (Spanish: Reserva Natural El Arenal) is a natural reserve with an area of . It is located in the Matagalpa department in central Nicaragua. The government permits small settlements and farmers to stay in the region within the reserve.

El Arenal comprises one of 78 protected areas of Nicaragua and is managed by Ministry of the Environment and Natural Resources (MARENA).

References

Protected areas of Nicaragua
Matagalpa Department
Central American pine–oak forests